Elizabeth Farnsworth (born 1943) is an American journalist and author of the memoir, A Train Through Time – A Life, Real and Imagined (February, 2017).

Early life and education
Farnsworth was born Elizabeth Fink  in Minneapolis, Minnesota, and grew up in Topeka, Kansas, where her family arrived as pioneers in the 19th century.

Farnsworth is a graduate of Topeka High School and Middlebury College, where she graduated magna cum laude.  She earned an M.A. in Latin American History from Stanford University and lived in Peru and Chile for extended periods.

Farnsworth first appeared regularly on public television in 1975 as a panelist covering Latin America on the national television program "World Press", produced by KQED in San Francisco. In the 1970s and 80’s she contributed articles to the San Francisco Chronicle, Foreign Policy, and Mother Jones, among other publications. With Stephen Talbot she wrote a column, Dispatches, for The Nation. With Eric Leenson and Richard Feinberg, she wrote about the economic blockade against Chile during the years Salvador Allende was president. That research became a book, El Bloqueo Invisible, in Buenos Aires in 1973.

In 1984 she became a contributing correspondent to The MacNeil/Lehrer NewsHour, later known as The NewsHour with Jim Lehrer and then PBS Newshour. In 1995 she became chief correspondent and principal substitute anchor, and in 1999 became senior correspondent and head of the San Francisco office. 
From 1984 until 2005, she reported in print and on television from numerous countries, among them:Vietnam, Cambodia, South Korea, Japan, Chile, Peru, Guatemala, Saudi Arabia, Iran, Iraq, Israel (the West Bank and Gaza), Botswana, Malawi and Turkey.

Her 2001 four-part series on the AIDS crisis (produced by Joanne Elgart Jennings) received the 2001 Silver World Medal from the New York Festivals and a national Emmy nomination.

In 1983 Farnsworth co-produced (with Stephen Talbot) The Gospel and Guatemala, which won a Golden Gate Award at the San Francisco Film Festival and aired on PBS. In 1990 she co-produced (with John Knoop) Thanh’s War, which aired on PBS and won a Cine Golden Eagle.

In 2008 Farnsworth and co-producer/director Patricio Lanfranco released The Judge and the General, a feature-length documentary film about the personal transformation of Chilean Judge Juan Guzmán as he tries to bring Augusto Pinochet to justice for human rights crimes. The film opened at the San Francisco Film Festival, aired on public television on POV, and garnered a 2008 Directors Guild of America nomination for Outstanding Directorial Achievement and a 2008 Emmy award nomination for Best Historical Documentary.  The Judge and the General won a 2010 duPont-Columbia Award for excellence in broadcast journalism.

Farnsworth was a Fellow at the Center for Art Environment of the Nevada Art Museum from 2010 to 2013.  In June 2013 an exhibit, Fracked: North Dakota’s Oil boom, featuring photographs by Terry Evans and written by Farnsworth, opened at the Field Museum of Natural History in Chicago.  After a year, the exhibit traveled to the North Dakota Museum of Art, and since then it has traveled to other cities in North Dakota.

She is a former member of the Board of Directors of the World Affairs Council of Northern California and currently a member of that organization’s Advisory Committee. She also serves on the Advisory Committee of the UC Berkeley School of Law Human Rights Center.

She received an honorary doctorate degree from Washburn College (2021) and Colby College (2002).

Farnsworth has been married to Charles E. Farnsworth since 1966.  They have three children and six grandchildren.

https://www.fieldmuseum.org/at-the-field/exhibitions/fractured-north-dakotas-oil-boom

https://placesjournal.org/article/dakota-is-everywhere/

https://www.nevadaart.org/author/terry-evans/

References

External links
Elizabeth Fink Farnsworth at Middlebury College

1943 births
Living people
Middlebury College alumni
American television personalities
American women television personalities
Stanford University alumni
People from Topeka, Kansas
People from Minneapolis